Anastacio or Anastácio is a given name and surname. Notable people with that name include

Given name
Anastácio Artur Ruben Sicato, Angolan politician
Anastácio Alves (born 1963), Portuguese priest 
Anastacio Caedo (1907–1990), Filipino sculptor
Anastacio Martínez (born 1978), Dominican baseball pitcher
Anastacio Reyes (born 1949), Mexican basketball player
Anastacio Vera (born 1985), Paraguayan footballer

Middle name
João Anastácio Rosa (1812–1884), Portuguese actor and sculptor
José Anastácio da Cunha (1744 – 1787), Portuguese mathematician

Surname
Maurício de Oliveira Anastácio (born 1962), Brazilian footballer 
Adílson Luíz Anastácio (born 1959), Brazilian footballer

See also

Anastacia (given name)
Anastacio (disambiguation)
Anastasio
Anastasius (disambiguation)

Masculine given names